La 1, LA 1 or LA-1 may refer to:
 Louisiana Highway 1, a state highway in Louisiana
 Louisiana State Route 1, a former state highway in Louisiana, also known as the Jefferson Highway
 Louisiana's 1st congressional district, an American congressional district

In broadcasting:
 La 1 (Spanish TV channel), a Spanish TV channel
 RSI La 1, a Swiss Italian-language TV channel